Chandra Bharati (1525-1578) was a 16th-century poet, litterateur and proficient of Sanskrit grammar  from Barpeta, Kamrup.
The inscription on a stone slab on the hill in Rajaduar, abutting on the Brahmaputra, claims that the hill was the abode of Chandra Bharati.

Family
His wife's name was Tara Devi. Their son Bhattadeva was known as "father of Assamese prose".

See also
 Bakul Kayastha
 Bhusana Dvija

References

Kamrupi literary figures
Poets from Assam
Assamese-language poets
1525 births
1578 deaths
People from Barpeta
16th-century Indian poets